The following is a list of notable mountain passes in Wales:

References 
Where not otherwise specified, much information is taken from 1:25,000 and 1:50,000 scale maps published by the Ordnance Survey.
 

 
Mountain pas
Wales
Mountain passes